Munduruthy (or, Munduruthi) is a small village belonging to Chittatukara panchayat.

North Paravur Block, Ernakulam District, Kerala. The village is under Mannam Postoffice and the pin code as 683520. There are about 100 families included in it and the nearby places are Palathuruth, Thekkumpuram, Thannipadam. There is a bridge that connecting Munduruthy and Thannipadam, that makes an easy path to go to North Paravur.

Education
 Ankanvaddy, Munduruthy
 DDSHS Karimpadam
 SNHSS North Paravur

Transportation
 Paravur - Kottayilkovilakom road via Munduruthy
 There was a private bus service at Munduruthy before and now its stopped

See also
 North Paravur
 Ernakulam district

References 

Villages in Ernakulam district